The Minister of Posts and Telegraphs, to which was later added the charge of Telephones (the position was later named "Minister of Posts and Telecommunications"), was, in the Government of France, the cabinet member in charge of the French Postal Service and development of the national telecommunication system. 
The position was occasionally combined with Minister of Commerce and Industry or Minister of Public Works.  The ministerial position does not currently exist, and its portfolio has largely been merged into other ministerial positions.

Officeholders

Ministers of Posts and Telegraphs
Adolphe Cochery : 5 February 1879 – 6 April 1885
Ferdinand Sarrien : 6 April 1885 – 7 January 1886
Félix Granet : 7 January 1886 – 30 May 1887
Jean Marty : 20 March 1894 – 30 May 1894
Victor Lourties : 30 May 1894 – 26 January 1895
André Lebon : 26 January 1895 – 1 November 1895
Gustave Mesureur : 1 November 1895 – 29 April 1896
Henry Boucher : 29 April 1896 – 28 June 1898
Émile Maruéjouls : 28 June 1898 – 1 November 1898
Paul Delombre : 1 November 1898 – 22 June 1899
Alexandre Millerand : 22 June 1899 –  7 June 1902
Georges Trouillot : 7 June 1902 – 24 January 1905
Fernand Dubief : 24 January 1905 – 12 November 1905
Georges Trouillot : 12 November 1905 – 14 March 1906

Public Works, Posts and Telegraphs
In 1906 Louis Barthou became Minister of Public Works, Posts and Telegraphs. The combined portfolio lasted until 1913.
Louis Barthou : 14 March 1906 – 24 July 1909
Alexandre Millerand : 24 July 1909 – 3 November 1910
Louis Puech : 3 November 1910 – 2 March 1911
Charles Dumont : 2 March 1911 – 27 June 1911
Victor Augagneur : 27 June 1911 – 14 January 1912
Jean Dupuy : 14 January 1912 – 22 March 1913

Commerce, Industry, Posts, and Telegraphs
In March 1913 Alfred Massé became Minister of Commerce, Industry, Posts, and Telegraphs. 
Alfred Massé : 22 March 1913 -  9 December 1913
Louis Malvy : 9 December 1913 – 17 March 1914
Raoul Péret : 17 March 1914 -  9 June 1914
Marc Réville : 9 June 1914 – 13 June 1914
Gaston Thomson : 13 June 1914 – 29 October 1915
Étienne Clémentel : 29 October 1915 – 27 November 1919
Louis Dubois : 27 November 1919 – 20 January 1920
Louis Loucheur : 29 March 1924 -  9 June 1924
Pierre Étienne Flandin : 9 June 1924 – 14 June 1924
Henry Chéron : 14 September 1928 – 11 November 1928

Posts, Telegraphs and Telephones
Louis Germain-Martin : 3 November 1929 – 21 February 1930
Julien Durand : 21 February 1930 – 2 March 1930
André Mallarmé : 2 March 1930 – 13 December 1930
Georges Bonnet : 13 December 1930 – 27 January 1931
Charles Guernier : 27 January 1931 – 20 February 1932
Louis Rollin : 20 February 1932 – 3 June 1932
Henri Queuille : 3 June 1932 – 18 December 1932
Laurent Eynac : 18 December 1932 – 26 October 1933
Jean Mistler : 26 October 1933 – 30 January 1934
Paul Bernier : 3 January 1934 – 9 February 1934
André Mallarmé : 9 February 1934 – 8 November 1934
Georges Mandel : 8 November 1934 – 4 June 1936
Robert Jardillier : 4 June 1936 – 22 June 1937
Jean-Baptiste Lebas : 22 June 1937 – 18 January 1938
Fernand Gentin : 18 January 1938 – 13 March 1938
Jean-Baptiste Lebas : 13 March 1938 – 10 April 1938
Alfred Jules-Julien : 10 April 1938 – 21 March 1940
Alfred Jules-Julien : 21 March 1940 – 16 June 1940
André Février : 27 June 1940 – 12 July 1940
François Piétri : 12 July 1940 – 6 September 1940
Jean Berthelot : 6 September 1940 – 18 April 1942
Robert Gibrat : 18 April 1942 – 18 November 1942
Jean Bichelonne : 18 November 1942 – 20 August 1944
Augustin Laurent : 10 September 1944 – 27 June 1945
Eugène Thomas : 27 June 1945 – 26 January 1946
Jean Letourneau : 26 January 1946 – 16 December 1946
Eugène Thomas : 16 December 1946 – 22 January 1947
Eugène Thomas : 9 May 1947 – 22 October 1947
Eugène Thomas : 29 October 1949 – 7 February 1950
Charles Brune : 7 February 1950 – 11 August 1951
Joseph Laniel : 11 August 1951 – 4 October 1951
Roger Duchet : 4 October 1951 – 20 January 1952
Roger Duchet :20 January 1952 – 8 March 1952     
Roger Duchet : 8 March 1952 – 28 June 1953
Pierre Ferri : 28 June 1953 – 19 June 1954
Édouard Bonnefous : 23 February 1955 – 1 February 1956
Eugène Thomas : 9 June 1958 – 8 January 1959
Bernard Cornut-Gentille : 8 January 1959 – 5 February 1960
Michel Maurice-Bokanowski : 5 February 1960 – 15 April 1962
Jacques Marette : 15 April 1962 – 6 April 1967
Yves Guéna : 6 April 1967 – 30 May 1968
André Bettencourt : 30 May 1968 – 10 July 1968
Yves Guéna : 10 July 1968 – 22 June 1969
Robert Galley : 22 June 1969 – 6 July 1972
Hubert Germain : 6 July 1972 – 1 March 1974
Jean Royer : 1 March 1974 – 11 April 1974
Hubert Germain : 11 April 1974 – 27 May 1974
Louis Mexandeau : 22 May 1981 – 22 March 1983
Alain Madelin : 20 March 1986 – 12 May 1988
Paul Quilès : 12 May 1988 – 15 May 1991
Émile Zuccarelli : 2 April 1992 – 29 March 1993
Gérard Longuet : 29 March 1993 – 14 October 1994
José Rossi : 17 October 1994 – 18 May 1995
François Fillon : 18 May 1995 – 7 November 1995
Franck Borotra : 7 November 1995 – 4 June 1997

See also
 Orange S.A.
 La Poste (France)

References

France, Posts, Telegraphs, and Telephones
Posts, Telegraphs, and Telephones
Communications in France
Defunct organizations based in France